Christian Anthony Hillard Jolley (born 12 May 1988) is an English former professional footballer who played as a winger or a striker. He is currently the assistant manager at Dartford.

He has previously played for Oxted & District, Warlingham, Kingstonian, AFC Wimbledon, Newport County, Forest Green Rovers, Grimsby Town, Margate, Hampton & Richmond Borough, Woking and Leatherhead.

Club career
Jolley began his career at Oxted and District while working at a local gym called Tandridge Trust, Leisure & Culture Limited (formerly Tandridge Leisure Limited). In September 2009, he was given a trial by Kingstonian which led to Jolley signing a contract with the club in December 2009. He immediately broke into a first team which narrowly missed out on promotion via the playoffs.

After impressing at Kingstonian, Jolley was signed by AFC Wimbledon in May 2010. He scored on his debut away against Southport on the first day of the 2010–11 season. 
He was an unused substitute for the team's play-off final victory over Luton Town that season, which won Wimbledon promotion to the Football League via a penalty shoot-out after a goalless 120 minutes, in which they returned to league football for the first time since Wimbledon F.C. split into AFC Wimbledon and MK Dons. On 3 July 2011, he signed a new contract. On 29 July, Jolley started for the Dons in their first ever League Cup match, producing an assist for Jack Midson.

On 15 November 2012, Jolley joined Conference National side Newport County on loan. He made his debut for the club on 18 November 2012, scoring Newport's only goal in a 3–1 home defeat by Hyde. After his prolific form, consisting of five league goals in only four league games, Jolley was recalled by AFC Wimbledon on 14 December 2012. However, on 11 January 2013 Jolley returned to Newport County on a permanent deal for an undisclosed fee. In the 2012–13 season he was part of the Newport team that finished third in the league, reaching the Conference National playoffs. Newport County won the playoff final versus Wrexham at Wembley Stadium 2–0 to return to the Football League after a 25-year absence with promotion to Football League Two. Jolley scored the first goal. In June 2013, Jolley was named in the 2012–13 Conference Premier team of the year

On 25 September 2014, Jolley joined Forest Green Rovers on a one-month loan. He made his Forest Green debut on 27 September 2014, playing 69 minutes in a 2–1 home defeat against Barnet. On 24 October 2014, it was confirmed that his loan spell with Forest Green had been extended by a further month. Having made seven league appearances, his loan spell with the club came to an end on 22 November 2014 after Forest Green boss Adrian Pennock confirmed he would be returning to Newport County. On 21 January 2015, having made only 5 league appearances in the 2014–15 season, Jolley's contract with Newport County was terminated by mutual consent.

On 26 January 2015, Jolley signed for Conference Premier side Grimsby Town until the end of the season.

On 27 June 2015, Jolley signed for National League South side Margate. After just one campaign in Kent, Jolley opted to reunite with former Kingstonian manager, Alan Dowson at Hampton & Richmond Borough in July 2016. In his two years at the club, Jolley featured over seventy times, before making the move to fellow National League South side, Woking, along with manager, Dowson. On the opening day of the campaign, he went onto make his Cards debut during their 1–0 away victory over East Thurrock United. After only featuring in just three league fixtures, Jolley sustained a long-term ankle injury later that month, which subsequently, ruled him out for three months. In order to gain match fitness, Jolley joined Surrey-based side, Leatherhead on a dual-registration basis and went onto feature twice before returning to the Woking starting XI in their FA Cup second round tie against Swindon Town. On 16 March 2019, Jolley scored his first goal for the club during a 3–3 draw with fellow promotion hopefuls, Welling United. Proceeding the conclusion of the 2018–19 campaign, Jolley announced his retirement from football, with a view to a coaching role at the club under Dowson.

On 20 June 2022, it was confirmed that Jolley would become assistant manager at Dartford, where he'd work under Dowson.

International career
Jolley made his debut for the England C team on 5 February 2013 as a second-half substitute in the 1–0 defeat against Turkey Under 23's.

Personal life
Following his retirement Jolley became the founder of Make Movements, a mobile massage and movement therapy business based in Surrey and London.

Career statistics

Honours

Club
AFC Wimbledon
Conference Premier play-offs: 2010–11

Newport County
Conference Premier play-offs: 2012–13

Woking
National League South play-offs: 2018–19

Individual
Conference Premier Team of the Year: 2012–13

References

External links

1988 births
Living people
People from Fleet, Hampshire
English footballers
England semi-pro international footballers
Association football forwards
Kingstonian F.C. players
AFC Wimbledon players
Newport County A.F.C. players
Forest Green Rovers F.C. players
Grimsby Town F.C. players
Margate F.C. players
Hampton & Richmond Borough F.C. players
Woking F.C. players
Leatherhead F.C. players
English Football League players
National League (English football) players